Mont Brequin is a mountain of Savoie, France. It lies in the Massif de la Vanoise range. It has an elevation of 3,130 metres above sea level.

Mountains of the Alps
Alpine three-thousanders
Mountains of Savoie